Kharfaq Lake is a high altitude natural lake located in the Karakoram mountain range in Kharfaq, Gilgit-Baltistan, Pakistan. The best month for tourist to see the lake is the July and August. The water of lake are starting increasing in May and reached it maximum level in the middle of July. In winter season the snow cover the whole in its whiteness and give beautiful views.

Wildlife 
The lake is famous for its indigenous fish species. The lake and its environs serve as an important wildlife habitat. The lake have thousand of trouts fish and desi fishes.

Location 
There is no road access to the lake, but a road has been under construction for a while but has not been complected due to a lack of funds.

Gallery

References 

Kharfak
Ghanche District
Kharfak